Qirui may refer to:
 Cai Qirui, a Chinese chemist, educator and academician
 Duan Qirui, a Chinese warlord and politician
 Chery Automobile, also known by its Chinese name Qirui